Allama Syed Shehanshah Hussain Naqvi is a Pakistani Shia scholar.

Education
Syed Shehanshah Hussain Naqvi received his Islamic education from Qom, Iran.

Unity of the Islamic world
Syed Shehanshah Hussain Naqvi has underlined the need for the Muslims to forge unity, putting aside their differences to successfully fail the agendas of imperialist forces. He has emphasized the need for unity and fraternity among Sunni-Shia Muslims.

Views

Political views 
Syed Shehanshah Hussain Naqvi has said that the message of Hussainiyat the path of Imam Hussain ibne Ali is the headspring of freedom, independence, and peace. He supports the liberty of Kashmir and Palestine, and says that international organizations must play their role in stopping atrocities in Kashmir, Palestine, Bahrain, Yemen, Syria, Qateef, Afghanistan, Nigeria, and Rohingya. He believes no oppression can succeed against the spirit of Karbala, and that the oppressed will always be victorious. He claims that terrorism, injustice, corruption and obscenity are all un-Islamic forms of Yazeediyat and can be confronted by carrying the flag of Hussainiyat.

On extremism
Syed Shehanshah Hussain Naqvi was one of the Islamic scholars who openly condemned and spoke against terrorists and terrorism when it was at its peak in Pakistan and most Islamic scholars were reluctant to speak about it. He took a stance and urged the Government to crush every terrorist network

Majalis in Pakistan
Syed Shehanshah Hussain Naqvi addresses many majalis every year in Pakistan. During the first ashra (10 days) of Muharram he addresses different majalis in Karachi. The prominent majalis of 1st ashra of Muharram in Karachi are:
 Nishtar Park
 Masjid e Babul Ilm
 Imam Bargah Baqiyat Ullah
 Aza Khana Zehra (s.a)
 Ali Muttaqi Jafri House (Mehfil e Shah e Shaheedan or Imambargah Shah e Shaheedan)
 Masjid e Imam E Zamana A.S Jamshoro

Majalis in foreign countries
Syed Shehanshah Hussain Naqvi also addresses majalis in different countries including United States, UK, Canada, Australia, Netherland, Italy etc.

Political interactions

He talks about the responsibilities of a religious leader based on sayings of Imam Ali (AS).

He met with Prime Minister Imran Khan on 3rd Oct, 2019 in the Prime Minister Secretariat, Islamabad.

See also
 Arif Hussain Hussaini
 Mufti Jafar Hussain
 Talib Jauhari
 Shia Ulema Council
 Syed Ali Raza Rizvi

References

External links
 Allama Syed Shehanshah Hussain Naqvi's Official Facebook Page
 Allama Syed Shahenshah Hussain Naqvi Audio Majalis Ashra Muharram 1438 (Such TV)
 Allama Syed Shahenshah Hussain Naqvi Majalis 2012

Pakistani Shia Muslims
21st-century Muslim scholars of Islam
Pakistani Shia clerics
Living people
1975 births